Simon Hayes is a British sound engineer.
Hayes won an Academy Award for Best Sound at the 85th Academy Awards for his work on Les Misérables.  He won a BAFTA for Best Sound for the same film. In 2022, the 94th Academy Awards included Hayes as a nominee for Best Sound Mixing for his work on No Time to Die.

Career
After starting work as a runner for a Commercials production company when he was 16 years old, Simon Hayes moved into the sound department as an assistant and then boom operator, before mixing his first feature film, Lock, Stock and Two Smoking Barrels at the age of 27. Hayes was the production sound mixer for the 2012 epic period musical film Les Misérables, for which the Academy of Motion Picture Arts and Sciences awarded him the Oscar for Best Sound Mixing at the 85th Academy Awards, alongside Andy Nelson and Mark Paterson. The director Tom Hooper required all singing in the film to be recorded live, which was widely deemed to be impracticable. Hayes and his team undertook complex recording, editing and mixing processes to achieve Hooper's aim. They captured recordings of the actors amidst loud film sets, edited the vocals, then overdubbed the orchestration.

Awards
Academy Award for Best Sound, Les Misérables, 85th Academy Awards, 2013.
Conch Award for Production Sound Mixer of the year, 2008 
Satellite Award for Best Sound (Editing and Mixing), 2012 
CAS Award for Outstanding Achievement in Sound Mixing, 2013 
BAFTA for Best Sound, Les Misérables, 2013

Nominations
BAFTA for Best Sound, Fantastic Beasts and Where to Find Them, 2017
Oscar for Best Sound Mixing, No Time to Die, 2022
BAFTA for Best Sound, No Time to Die, 2022

Filmography

Personal life
Hayes is a 4th degree Brazilian jiu-jitsu blackbelt and coaches at Carlson Gracie London. He also holds a 2nd dan blackbelt in Judo. Hayes raced BMX in the 1980s winning the 1985 European BMX Championships in Barcelona.

References

External links
Official site

Year of birth missing (living people)
Living people
British audio engineers
Best Sound Mixing Academy Award winners
Best Sound BAFTA Award winners